Daniel H. Reese was an American publisher and political leader in Louisiana. He was a delegate at the Louisiana Constitutional Convention of 1868. He edited the Lafourche Republican in Thibodaux, Louisiana.

Fellow Lafourche Parish representative William Murrell nominated Reese to be speaker of the Louisiana House. He served as president of the school board. He received a contract to publish the laws of the General Assembly.

References

19th-century American politicians
People from Thibodaux, Louisiana
Members of the Louisiana House of Representatives
Year of birth missing (living people)